Chermside is a suburb in the City of Brisbane, Queensland, Australia. It is home to a large Westfield shopping centre.

Geography 
Chermside is a key destination along Queensland Transport's future Northern Busway, and home to Westfield Chermside, the largest Westfield shopping centre in Australia, with a three-storey Myer and a 16 screen cinema complex.

History
The Chermside area was first settled by Europeans in the late 19th century. The first plot of land was sold on 23 May 1866, and the population has progressively increased since with a significant increase with the post-war residential development.

When the Gympie goldrush started in 1867, many travellers heading north would run into trouble at a creek in present-day Chermside. Because of this waterway, Chermside was first known as Downfall Creek.

In November 1868 Cobb & Co. stagecoaches began to travel through the area on the way to the goldfields at Gympie.

A United Methodist Free church opened on Sunday 11 August 1878 on the corner of Gympie Road and Banfield Street, (then Church Street, approx ). In 1926 a more central site was purchased on the south-east corner of Gympie Road and Hamilton Road and the church building was relocated to the new site and renovated. It was replaced by a brick church which opened on 30 September 1950. It became part of the Uniting Church in 1977. This brick church was demolished in 2004, probably because the current Chermside-Kedron Community Church (a Uniting Church) in Chermside on the north-western corner of Gympie Road and Rode Road had opened on 23 September 2001.

Downfall Creek State School opened on 9 July 1900. In 1903, it was renamed Chermside State School. It closed in December 1996. It was on the north-western corner of the intersection of Gympie Road and Rode Road.

In 1904 the district's name was changed to Chermside after the Governor of Queensland, Sir Herbert Chermside.

Regular Anglican services commenced circa 1906 in the public hall (School of Arts) on the corner of Gympie Road and Hall Street. In January 1913 land was purchased in Hamilton Road to build an Anglican church. A stump-capping ceremony was held on St James' Day 25 July 1914. The first service was held on 11 October 1914. The official dedication of All Saints Anglican Church by Archbishop St Clair Donaldson was held on 15 November 1914. The foundation stone of the present church building was laid by Archbishop Reginald Halse on Sunday 11 December 1960. The church was extended in 1996.

Chermside has had a library since 1909. Since 1951 it has been a branch of the Brisbane City Council Library service and had a major refurbishment in 2017.

In December 1925, "Rainey's Hill Top Park" made up of 99 allotments were advertised to be auctioned by Thonton's & Pearce, Auctioneers. A map advertising the auction states that this estate is "close to tram, motor bus, water and electric light".

The Dawn picture theatre first opened on 3 November 1928 (showing The Man Who Laughs). It closed on 9 August 2005 (with Mr. & Mrs. Smith). It was at 708 Gympie Road, now the site of the North Brisbane Eye Centre. It was the last single screen cinema in Brisbane.

The Sanctuary in the Wheller Gardens retirement village was dedicated on 5 March 1940 by Reverend Wilfred Leonard Slater, the President of the Methodist Conference.

During World War II a diverse range of volunteers, soldiers, and camps were at Chermside, such as U.S. Army units, including a number of African American soldiers. A Kitty Hawk airplane on a training flight crashed there in 1943, killing the pilot and instructor.

Brisbane's tramway network finally reached the suburb on 29 March 1947, and Chermside remained the northernmost point on the system until the line to Chermside was closed on 2 December 1968. The tram line along Gympie Road was separated from other traffic (this is commonly called "reserved track"), which resulted in fast travel times along this portion of the route. Another feature of the Chermside tram line were the rose gardens which bordered the reserved track portion of the line.

Westfield Chermside first opened in May 1957 as The Chermside Drive-in Shopping Centre with an Allan & Stark's department store and a small arcade of a dozen shops, before becoming a Myer department store. It was the first drive-in shopping centre in Australia. It is now the largest single level shopping centre in Australia, with a 3-storey Myer, as well as a 16-screen Birch, Carrol and Coyle megaplex. It is also home to Brisbane's first Apple Store.

St Thomas' Anglican Church in Chermside East (now Wavell Heights) was dedicated on 13 October 1957 by Archbishhop Reginald Halse. Its closure on 21 December 1990 was approved by Assistant Bishop George Browning. It was deconsecrated was authorised by Archbishop Peter Hollingworth.

The Prince Charles Hospital (a public hospital) was opened in 1959.

The Brisbane Chest Hospital was opened in 1954 for the treatment of tuberculosis. As tuberculosis declined, it was renamed The Chermside Hospital in 1961 to reflect its more general healthcare role. Prince Charles visited Brisbane in 1974 and the hospital was renamed The Prince Charles Hospital in his honour.

St Laurence's Anglican Church in Chermside West was dedicated on 26 February 1966 by Archbishop Phillip Strong. It has since closed.

The early 1970s saw the opening of Queensland's first Kmart store in Chermside, which was situated next to a Coles supermarket. Both of these stores closed in the mid-1990s and have been replaced with a Woolworths supermarket and specialty stores. Both Kmart and Coles have been relocated in Westfield Chermside.

Craigslea State School opened 24 January 1972 and the neighbouring Craiglea State High School opened on 28 January 1975. Both are now within Chermside West.

In 1975 the area known as Chermside West was established as a separate suburb.

Prince Charles Hospital Special School closed on 30 December 1983.

The Burnie Brae Centre (also known as Chermside Senior Citizens Centre) opened in 1984, from funds raised by the Rotary Club of Chermside. It was named for the Burnie Brae Homestead that had originally occupied the site.

Holy Spirit Northside Private Hospital opened 30 July 2001; it was operated by the Sisters of Charity and the Holy Spirit Missionary Sisters. In September 2019 it was renamed St Vincent's Private Hospital Northside.

The median age of the Chermside population was 35 years of age, 2 years below the Australian median. 59.5% of people living in Chermside were born in Australia, compared to the national average of 69.8%; the next most common countries of birth were India 4%, New Zealand 3.8%, Philippines 2.7%, England 2.6%, China 1.5%. 67.9% of people spoke only English at home; the next most popular languages were 1.7% Malayalam,1.5% Tagalog, 1.3% Italian, 1.3% Mandarin, 0.9% Korean.

It was described in that year as one of Brisbane's fastest developing suburbs.

Heritage listings 
There are a number of heritage-listed sites in Chermside:

 590 Gympie Road: Chermside School Building (former) & Arbor Day trees
 930 Gympie Road: H.M. Wheller Garden Settlement
 992 Gympie Road: Vellnagel's Blacksmith Shops
61 Kittyhawk Drive: Chermside Historical Precinct
 9 Mermaid Street: Chermside Telephone Exchange
 627 Rode Road: Chermside Chest Clinic (former) boiler house chimney

Education 
There are no schools in Chermside. The nearest government primary schools are Wavell Heights State School in neighbouring Wavell Heights to the east, Craigslea State School in neighbouring Chermside West to the west, Geebung State School in neighbouring Geebung to the north-east, and Somerset Hills State School in neighbouring Stafford Heights to the south-west. The nearest government secondary schools are Wavell Heights State High School in neighbouring Wavell Heights to the south-east and Craigslea State High School in neighbouring Chermside West to the west.

Facilities 
Chermside Police Beat Shopfront is within the Westfield Shoppingtown.

Chermside Fire Station is at 526 Hamilton Road.

Chermside Ambulance Station is at 520 Hamilton Road, adjacent to the fire station.

There are a number of hospitals in Chermside:

 The Prince Charles Hospital, 627 Rode Road, a public hospital
 St Vincent's Private Hospital Northside, a private hospital
 Icon Cancer Care Chermside, a provate clinic for day patients
 Chermside Dialysis Clinic, a private clinic for day patients.
 Chermside Day Hospital, a private hospital for day patients
 Hummingbird House, a private hospice for children
There is a medical centre in Chermside:

 SmartClinics Chermside Family Medical centre  Shop/212 Gympie Road.

Wheller Gardens is a retirement village.

Amenities 
There are a number of shopping centres in the Chermside:

 Westfield Shoppingtown Chermside at the north-east corner of Gympie Road and Hamilton Road
 Chermside Markets shopping centre at 725 Webster Road
 Chermside Place shopping centre at 725 Gympie Road 

The Brisbane City Council operates a public library at 375 Hamilton Road (corner of Kittyhawk Drive).

The Burnie Brae Centre (also known as Chermside Senior Citizens Centre) is at 60 Kuran Street.

All Saints Anglican Church is at 501 Hamilton Road.

Chermside Kedron Community Church is at 590 Gympie Road (corner of Rode Road) on the site of the former Chermside State School. It is part of the Uniting Church in Australia.

The Sanctuary is at 930 Gympie Road. It is with the grounds of the Wheller Gardens retirement village and is part of the Uniting Church in Australia.

The Church of Jesus Christ of the Latter Day Saints is at 391 Rode Road.

Centrepoint Church (formerly Chermside Assembly of God) is at 240 Hamilton Road. It is part of the Australian Christian Churches network.

Kedron Wavell Services Club is at 21 Kittyhawk Drive. It offers dining, bars, and entertainment. It is operated by the Kedron Wavell RSL sub-branch and has over 60,000 members. As a not-for-profit organisation, surplus funds are used to fund community projects.

Chermside SmartClinics Medical centre is in Chermside Shopping centre. Shop/212 Gympie Rd, Chermside QLD 4032

There are a number of sporting facilities:

 Chermside Bowls Club at 468 Rode Road
 Shawsportz sports centre in Burringar Park
 Chermside Aquatic Centre & Water Park at 375 Hamilton Road

There are a number of parks including:

 7th Brigade Park (named in honour of the Australian 7th Brigade) at 375 Hamilton Road which contains numerous facilities such as the library and the aquatic centre at the Hamilton Road end and then extends northward with sporting fields and green space around Downfall Creek
Burnie Brae Park (also known as Annand Park) at 106 Meemar Street, including the Burnie Brae Centre (also known as Chermside Senior Citizens Centre) 
Dead Man's Gully Park at 5 Abarth Street
John Patterson Park (also known as Kidston Park) at 57 Norman Drive
Packer Place (including Terry Hampson Reserve) at 25 The Boulevard

Attractions 
The Chermside Historical Precinct is at 61 Kittyhawk Drive. It consists of three buildings:

 the original Chermside State School building, built in 1900 and relocated to the site circa 1997 and now home to the Chermside & Districts Historical Society
 the Sandgate Drill Hall, built in 1915 and relocated to the site in 2000 and now home to the Milne Bay Memorial Library and Research Centre
 Training Ship Voyager Centre Sea Scouts' hall (built circa 1964), now used as a community craft centre

Transport 
The Northern Busway between the Royal Children's Hospital and Windsor was completed in August 2009, and an extra 3 km of busway between Windsor and Kedron opened in June 2012 with Airport Link and 2 new busway stations at Lutwyche and Kedron. Planning for the ultimate Northern Busway between Kedron and Bracken Ridge (including Chermside) is being revised with stages subject to funding and government priority.

References

Further reading

External links

Chermside and Districts Historical Society
University of Queensland: Queensland Places: Chermside and Chermside West
Chermside Suburb Information
 
 
 Chermside tram line photo, 1952

Suburbs of the City of Brisbane
Queensland in World War II